Gaspar Ariño Ortiz (6 January 1936 – 5 January 2023) was a Spanish lawyer, professor, and politician. A member of the People's Party, he served in the Congress of Deputies from 1989 to 1993.

Ariño died in Madrid on 5 January 2023, at the age of 86.

References

1936 births
2023 deaths
Spanish lawyers
People's Party (Spain) politicians
Members of the 4th Congress of Deputies (Spain)
University of Valencia alumni
People from the Province of Valencia